Rex Pemberton (born 1983) is an extreme sport participant and motivational speaker, best known as being the youngest male Australian ever to climb Mount Everest.

Mountaineering
Born and raised in Sydney, Pemberton was educated at Knox Grammar School and the University of Western Sydney. He climbed his first alpine peak when he was 16. He raised $100,000 for his Everest climb and another $100,000 to fund his climbs of the remaining Seven Summits, which he completed in late 2006 and was the third youngest person in the world to complete this feat. He produced a documentary film of his Everest ascent, entitled To Stand Above the Clouds.

Wingsuit Flying
As a keen skydiver, Rex soon transitioned to wingsuit flying then progressing to wingsuit base jumping and proximity flying. Rex rose to the top of the wingsuit world and now competes at the world championships, with third place being his best result.

Rex has designed and built the X-Wing, a jet powered carbon-fiber wing.

Personal life
Pemberton is married to Emily Guilding. He is the brother of former Miss Australia Caroline Pemberton.

Filmography
 To Stand Above the Clouds (2006)

References

Living people
1984 births
People educated at Knox Grammar School
Australian summiters of Mount Everest